TAME operated flights to domestic destinations and international destinations. All destinations were operated from Quito.

TAME destinations
Key:

References 

Lists of airline destinations